Album 34 is an album released by popular Soca artist Machel Montano from Trinidad and Tobago in 2010.

Track listing
"Bumper to Fender"
"Alright (Ramajay)"
"Hot Like" - (featuring feat. Serani)
"Thiefin"
"Doh Hold Meh Back"
"No Behaviour"
"Slow Wine"
"Really Hot" - (featuring feat. Wildfire)
"Wooeeii Gyal Wooeeii" - (featuring feat. Busy Signal)
"Tell Me"
"Fetting On" - (featuring feat. Skinny Fabulous)
"Doh Hold Meh Back (Remix)"
"No Behaviour (Road Mix)"
"Not Going Home"
"Wooeeii Gyal Wooeeii" (Tegareg Speed Remix)

References

Machel Montano albums
2010 albums